176 (one hundred [and] seventy-six) is the natural number following 175 and preceding 177.

In mathematics
176 is an even number and an abundant number. It is an odious number, a self number, a semiperfect number, and a practical number.

176 is a cake number, a happy number, a pentagonal number, and an octagonal number. 15 can be partitioned in 176 ways.

The Higman–Sims group can be constructed as a doubly transitive permutation group acting on a geometry containing 176 points, and it is also the symmetry group of the largest possible set of equiangular lines in 22 dimensions, which contains 176 lines.

In astronomy
 176 Iduna is a large main belt asteroid with a composition similar to that of the largest main belt asteroid, 1 Ceres
 Gliese 176 is a red dwarf star in the constellation of Taurus
 Gliese 176 b is a super-Earth exoplanet in the constellation of Taurus. This planet orbits close to its parent star Gliese 176

In the Bible

 Minuscule 176 (in the Gregory-Aland numbering), a Greek minuscule manuscript of the New Testament

In the military
 Attack Squadron 176 United States Navy squadron during the Vietnam War
  was a United States Navy troop transport during World War II, the Korean War and Vietnam War
  was a United States Navy  during World War II
  was a United States Navy  during World War II
  was a United States Navy Porpoise-class submarine during World War II
  was a United States Navy  during World War II
  was a United States Navy  following World War I
  was a United States Navy Sonoma-class fleet tug during World War II
 176th Wing is the largest unit of the Alaska Air National Guard

In transportation
 Heinkel He 176 was a German rocket-powered aircraft
 London Buses route 176
 176th Street, Bronx elevated station on the IRT Jerome Avenue Line of the New York City Subway

In other fields
176 is also:
 The year AD 176 or 176 BC
 176 AH is a year in the Islamic calendar that corresponds to 792 – 793 CE
 The atomic number of an element temporarily called Unsepthexium

See also
 List of highways numbered 176
 United Nations Security Council Resolution 176
 United States Supreme Court cases, Volume 176

External links

 Number Facts and Trivia: 176
 The Number 176
 The Positive Integer 176
 VirtueScience: 176
 Number Gossip: 176

References

Integers